Wang Jianmin (November 1942 – 28 September 2021) was a full general (shangjiang) of the People's Liberation Army (PLA) of China. He joined the PLA in June 1962, and the Chinese Communist Party in September 1963.

Career 
Wang was born in Luannan County, Hebei, in November 1942.
 1973, Operations office director and assistant section chief, operations section, operations department, Shenyang Military Region.
 1983, Assistant Department Chief, Operations Department.
 1985, Division Commander.
 1987, Department Chief, Operations Department, Shenyang Military Region Command.
 1989, Studied at the PLA National Defense University.
 1993, Deputy Commander, 23rd Group Army.
 1995, Commander, 23rd Group Army.  Commander, 39th Group Army.
 1997, Candidate member, 15th National People's Congress.
 1999, Chief of Staff, Shenyang Military Region.
 2000, Deputy Commander, Shenyang Military Region.
 2002, Commander, Chengdu Military Region.

He was a member of the 16th Central Committee of the Chinese Communist Party.

He attained the rank of major general in July 1994, lieutenant general in 2000, and full general on June 24, 2006.

On 28 September 2021, he died from an illness in Chengdu, Sichuan, aged 78.

References 

1942 births
2021 deaths
People from Tangshan
People's Liberation Army generals from Hebei
Members of the 16th Central Committee of the Chinese Communist Party
PLA National Defence University alumni
Commanders of the Chengdu Military Region